Prato Nevoso (or Pratonevoso) is a ski and holiday resort in northern Italy. It is located at 1480 m above sea level, in the province of Cuneo, Piedmont, within the municipal boundaries of the comune of Frabosa Sottana, of which it is a frazione, some four kilometres south of its centre.

History

Prato Nevoso's history as a resort dates back to the early 1960s, when a group of Ligurian entrepreneurs decided to create a resort easily accessible from Genoa and Turin.

The fast work of building and the low initial costs of the flats promoted spurred tourism, as well as the presence of the A6 Turin-Savona motorway (enlarged during the 1990s). The fast building did not follow any principle of organic urban program, and buildings were born in the complete architectural anarchy.

Giro d'Italia
As well as winter sports, the resort is popular with cyclists and has been the finish of three stages of the Giro d'Italia:

Tour de France 

On July 20, 2008, the town served as the finish line for a stage in the 2008 Tour de France.  The finish is rated First Category with an 11.4 km climb at an average of 6.9%.

Tour de France stage finishes

References

External links
 Prato Nevoso dans le Tour de France  
 Resort website 
 Prato Nevoso ski resort guide

Frazioni of the Province of Cuneo
Ski areas and resorts in Italy
Frabosa Sottana